"Kashmir" is a song by the English rock band Led Zeppelin. Included on their sixth album Physical Graffiti (1975), it was written by Jimmy Page and Robert Plant with contributions from John Bonham over a period of three years with lyrics dating to 1973.

The song became a concert staple, performed by the band at almost every concert after its release. It has been described as one of Led Zeppelin's two most overtly progressive epics (the other being "Stairway to Heaven").

Composition
Page uses a guitar tuning of D–A–D–G–A–D, which he had used for the instrumentals "White Summer" and "Black Mountain Side".  The song combines different rhythmic meters: the guitar riff is in triple meter, while the vocal is in quadruple meter. Plant felt that the drumming was an important component of the song and that Bonham did not overplay his part.

Page recorded a demo version with drummer Bonham late in 1973, when John Paul Jones was late for the recording sessions. Plant later added lyrics and a middle section; in early 1974, Jones added orchestration. Session players were brought in for the string and horn sections for "Kashmir" and Jones added a Mellotron.

The lyrics were written by Plant in 1973 immediately after Led Zeppelin's 1973 US tour. None of the group members had visited Kashmir. Instead, Plant was inspired during a drive through a desolate desert area of southern Morocco.

Live performances 
"Kashmir" was played live at almost every Led Zeppelin concert after its debut in 1975. A version from Knebworth in 1979 appears on the Led Zeppelin DVD (2003). The surviving members performed the song at the Atlantic Records 40th Anniversary concert in 1988.

Page and Plant recorded a longer, live version, with an Egyptian/Moroccan orchestra for No Quarter: Jimmy Page and Robert Plant Unledded (1994) and performed the song with an orchestra on their 1995 tour.

Led Zeppelin, with John Bonham's son Jason on drums, performed "Kashmir" at Led Zeppelin's reunion show at The O2, London on 10 December 2007. That rendition – released on Celebration Day in 2012 – was nominated in 2014 for the Grammy Award for Best Rock Performance at the 56th Grammys. Kashmir' actually isn't that difficult", Page remarked during rehearsals for the show. "But it helps to have a drummer who understands the part and a bass player who can play bass with his feet. Sometimes it sounds like John's got three feet. It's intense."

Reception 
All four members of Led Zeppelin have agreed that "Kashmir" is one of their best musical achievements. John Paul Jones suggested that it showcases all of the elements that made up the Led Zeppelin sound. Led Zeppelin archivist Dave Lewis comments:

In a retrospective review of Physical Graffiti (Deluxe Edition), Brice Ezell of PopMatters described "Kashmir" as Physical Graffitis "quintessential track". Ezell called "Kashmir"'s "doomy ostinato riff and rapturous post-chorus brass/mellotron section" as "inimitable moments in the legacy of classic rock".

Accolades
The song is listed highly in a number of professional music rankings:

(*) designates unordered lists

Charts and certifications

Certifications

Copyright issue
The 1988 Schoolly D song "Signifying Rapper", which samples "Kashmir", was the target of lawsuits following its use in the 1992 film Bad Lieutenant. In 1994, Page and Plant successfully sued Home Box Office to have the song removed from televised showings of the film and Live Home Video and distributor Aries Film Releasing were ordered to destroy any unsold copies of Bad Lieutenant as part of a copyright infringement ruling.

See also
List of cover versions of Led Zeppelin songs"Kashmir" entries

Notes
Footnotes

Citations

References

External links
"Kashmir" at LedZeppelin.com

1975 songs
Led Zeppelin songs
British progressive rock songs
Song recordings produced by Jimmy Page
Songs written by Jimmy Page
Songs written by John Bonham
Songs written by Robert Plant